El Toro is a municipality in the comarca of Alto Palancia, Castellón, Valencia, Spain.

The Sierra del Toro mountain range is named after this town.

Municipalities in the Province of Castellón
Alto Palancia